The  (the Kerava River) is a river in Finland. The 65-kilometer-long river starts from Lake Ridasjärvi in Hyvinkää, and it is a tributary of the Vantaa River that flows into the Gulf of Finland at Helsinki. As the name implies, the river runs through the town of Kerava.

See also
Kaljakellunta, an annual social event on the river
List of rivers of Finland

References

Rivers of Finland
Vantaa River basin